Mohamed El Morsy (born March 9, 1986) is an Egyptian football striker who plays for Egyptian Premier League side Ittihad on loan from El Zamalek.

He scored on his debut for Ittihad in the opening match of the league against Petrojet.

References

1986 births
Living people
Egyptian footballers
Al Ittihad Alexandria Club players
Zamalek SC players
Egyptian Premier League players
Association football forwards